Royal Ordnance Factory, ROF, Blackburn was part of the Ministry of Defence organisations producing components for the manufacture of armaments and arms related equipment from the late 1930 until after WWII. Commonly known locally as the "Fuse" or "Fuze", because the majority of components in production related to the fuse mechanisms used on most explosive devices at the time, bombs.

Providing local employment, the factory was known as a good employer and provided one of the best and respected apprenticeship schemes in the region.

Along with mass production of fuse mechanisms, it also developed Safety and Arming Mechanisms, S&A Units for many more of the sophisticated weapons in development during and after World War II. These S&A units provided safe handling for missiles whilst under transit conditions and safety for operator personnel up to the time of having to be armed. Bombs and missiles need specific launch conditions to be fulfilled to stop injury and fatalities to handlers during pre-launch.

Most well known missiles from the UK after World War II had S&A units from ROF Blackburn, including Blue Streak, and other weapons used at the time of the Falklands Crisis.

Medium-range ballistic missiles
Blackburn
Buildings and structures in Blackburn